Abdelmalek Ali Messaoud (27 May 1955 – 6 February 2022) was an Algerian football player who played as a defender for USM Alger. He had 38 caps and one goal for the Algeria national team.

International career
Ali Messaoud played 38 games for the Algeria national team. His first cap was against Morocco in a friendly match and the last game was against Congo, also he scored only one goal which was against Zambia in 1978 AFCON qualification at July 5, 1962 Stadium.

Personal life and death
Abdelmalek Ali Messaoud died on 6 February 2022, at the age of 66 due to complications from the COVID-19 pandemic in Algeria.

Honours
USM Alger
 Algerian Cup: 1980–81

Algeria
 Football at the Mediterranean Games: 1975

References

External links
 

1955 births
2022 deaths
20th-century Algerian people
People from Annaba Province
Algerian footballers
Association football defenders
Algeria international footballers
Hamra Annaba players
USM Alger players
USM Annaba players
Mediterranean Games gold medalists for Algeria
Mediterranean Games medalists in football
Competitors at the 1975 Mediterranean Games
African Games gold medalists for Algeria
African Games medalists in football
Competitors at the 1978 All-Africa Games